Mher Khachatryan  (born on March 21, 1989), is an Armenian actor and presenter, reporter-journalist. He is known for his role as Doctor Garik on Domino. He was one of the guests of Name The Tune on February 24 and on April 8, 2016. He has worked in Armnews TV as a reporter-journalist in 2012-2015. He was also one of the presenters of Evening Yerevan. He is currently the co-presenter of Evening Azoyan (with Armenian actor-presenter Hovhannes Azoyan).

Filmography

External links

References

1989 births
Living people
Male actors from Yerevan
Armenian male film actors
Armenian male television actors
21st-century Armenian male actors